Babelomurex tosanus is a species of sea snail, which is a marine gastropod mollusc in the family Muricidae, the murex or rock snails.

Description 
Its color is white or pale brown. It has spines in two configurations. In the first type, each spine on the shoulder is wide and expands vertically. In the other, each spine on the shoulder is thin, long and expands diagonally. It resembles Babelomurex nakayasui, but its body whorl is weak and each spine on the body whorl expands in an irregular direction.

Distribution 
It is found in Hawaii, South Africa and the southwest Pacific.

References

Further reading 
  
 
 

tosanus
Gastropods described in 1908